is a Japanese manga series written and illustrated by Mika Yamamori. It began serialization in Dessert in July 2020. As of November 2022, the series' individual chapters have been collected into five volumes.

Publication
Written and illustrated by Mika Yamamori, the series began serialization in Dessert on July 21, 2020. As of November 2022, the series individual chapters have been collected into five tankōbon volumes.

In June 2021, Kodansha USA announced that they licensed the series for English publication. In November 2021, Kodansha USA announced that the series would be released in print in Fall 2022.

Volume list

Reception
The series was nominated for the 2021 Next Manga Award on the print manga category. In the list of Da Vinci magazine's top 50 manga series of 2021, the series ranked 38th. The series won the semi-grand prize in the 2021 An An manga award. In the 2021 edition of the Kono Manga ga Sugoi! guidebook's top manga for female readers, the series ranked fourth. The series was nominated for the 46th Kodansha Manga Award in the shōjo manga category in 2022. In the 2022 edition of the Kono Manga ga Sugoi! guidebook's top manga for female readers, the series ranked eleventh.

Rebecca Silverman from Anime News Network praised the major characters and the story, though she also felt the character designs could be inconsistent at times. Demelza from Anime UK News praised the story as unique and relatable and the artwork as clean and polished.

See also
Daytime Shooting Star — Another manga series by the same author

References

External links
  
 

Kodansha manga
Romance anime and manga
School life in anime and manga
Shōjo manga